"Becchin'amor! – Che vuo', falso tradito?" is a sonnet by the Italian poet Cecco Angiolieri.

Lyrics

Short analysis
The sonnet is a parody of Italian medieval contrastos: it is a dialogue between the poet and the woman he loves, Becchina. She probably believes Cecco has been unfaithful, so she repulses him; in the last line the two lovers conciliate. We can easily understand the sonnet is a parody thanks to the combination of popular common sayings and courtly love's typical words.

Bibliography
Cecco Angiolieri, Rime, Fabbri editori, 1995
Romano Luperini, Pietro Catadi, Lidia Marchiani, Franco Marchese, il nuovo La scrittura e l'interpretazione, volume 1, Palumbo editore, 

Sonnets
Italian poems
Love poems
Humorous poems